Savapokhari is a rural municipality (gaunpalika) out of five rural municipality located in Sankhuwasabha District of Province No. 1 of Nepal. There are a total of 10 municipalities in Sankhuwasabha in which 5 are urban and 5 are rural.

Savapokhari, Dhupu and Bahrabise which previously were all separate Village development committee merged to form this new local level body. Fulfilling the requirement of the new Constitution of Nepal 2015, Ministry of Federal Affairs and Local Development replaced all old VDCs and Municipalities into 753 new local level body (Municipality).

The rural municipality is divided into total 6 wards and the headquarter of this newly formed rural municipality is situated in Bahrabise.

References
 The Chairman of this rural municipality is Mr. Ratna Bahadur Subba and the vice chairman is Mrs Sita Dahal. The names of ward chairman is given below.
Mr. Mani Sundar Rai                       Ward Number 1
Mr. Dik Prashad Subedi                    Ward Number 2
Mr. Dil Bahadur Tamang                    Ward Number 3
Mrs. Himali Rai                           Ward Number 4
Mr. Yam Bahadur Subba                     Ward Number 5
Mr. Bikash Poudel                         Ward Number 6

External links
 Official website
 Final District 1-75 Corrected Last for RAJPATRA

Rural municipalities in Koshi Province
Populated places in Sankhuwasabha District
Rural municipalities of Nepal established in 2017
Rural municipalities in Sankhuwasabha District